SR UNIVERSITY Sri Rajeshwara Educational Society (SR UNIVERSITY) is one of the first private universities in Telangana state in 2020. SR University is located near to Hyderabad, Telangana.

History
SREC was established in 2002 and is sponsored by the SR Educational Society. The institution has been ranked Number 91 in NIRF Engineering ranking category and 1st rank in self-financed private institutions in India by All India ranking for institutions innovation by MHRD. SR Engineering College has been given the status of private University by the State of Telangana and then named SR University.

Campus
The SR University campus is located in Ananthasagar village of Hasanparthy Mandal near Hyderabad, Telangana, India. It is in 150 acres, with both separate hostel facilities for boys and girls. There is a huge central library along with Indias largest Technology Business Incubator (TBI) in tier 2 cities.

Schools
S R University offers six schools & ten centers. with Bachelors, Masters, Doctoral programs in the following specialization with the approval of Government of India, Government of Telangana.

School of Computer Science and Artificial Intelligence 
 B.Tech. Computer Science and Engineering
 B.Tech. (Computer Science and Engineering) - Artificial Intelligence & Machine Learning
 B.Tech. (Computer Science and Engineering) - Cyber Security
 B.Tech. (Computer Science and Engineering) - Business Systems
 B.Tech. (Computer Science and Engineering) - Data Science
 M.Tech. (Computer Science and Engineering)
 M.Tech. (Artificial Intelligence & Machine Learning)
 Ph.D. (Computer Science and Engineering)

School of Engineering
 Electronics & Communication Engineering
 B.Tech. (Electronics & Communication Engineering)
 B.Tech. (Electronics & Communication Engineering) - Artificial Intelligence & Machine Learning
 B.Tech. (Electronics & Communication Engineering) - Internet of Things
 M.Tech. (VLSI)
 M.Tech. (Internet of Things)
 Ph.D. (Electronics and Communication Engineering)
 Electrical Engineering
 B.Tech. (Electrical and Electronics Engineering)
 M.Tech. (Power Electronics)
 Ph.D. (Electrical and Electronics Engineering)
 Civil Engineering
 B.Tech. (Civil Engineering)
 M.Tech. (Construction Technology and Management)
 Ph.D. (Civil Engineering)
 Mechanical Engineering
 B.Tech. (Mechanical Engineering)
 M.Tech. (Advanced Manufacturing Systems)
 Ph.D. (Mechanical Engineering)

School of Business

 BBA (Finance & Accounting | Marketing | Business Analytics) MBA (Integrated) - [3+2]
 MBA (Master of Business Administration )
 MBA (Innovation, Entrepreneurship & Venture Development)
 Ph.D. (Management)

School of Agriculture

 B.Sc.

School of Sciences

 Ph.D. (Mathematics)
 Ph.D. (Physics)
 Ph.D. (Chemistry)

Other Institutes of SR Group

 S.R. International Institute of Technology
 Sparkrill International School
 Sumathi Reddy Institute of Technology for Women
 S.R. Degree and P.G College
 S.R. Residential Junior College for Boys (M.P.C. block)
 S.R. Residential Junior College for Boys (Bi.P.C. block)
 S.R. Junior College for Girls (Day and Residential)
 S.R. Nava Vignana Bharathi Junior College for Boys (Day Scholars)
 S.R. Junior College for Girls
 S.R. Junior College for Boys
 K.N.R Junior College for Boys
 S.R. Junior College for Girls
 Gems Junior College for Boys, Karimnagar
 S.R. IIT Coaching Center
 S.R. EAMCET Coaching Center
 S.R. Residential High School for Boys (10th class only)
 S.R. High School for Boys (Day Scholars) (10th class only)
 S.R. High School for Girls (Day and Residential) (10th class only)
 S.R. National High School
 S.R. Junior college (DAY)

Admissions
Students are admitted into the Six Schools under the following Eligibility Criteria.
 A Pass in 10+2 or equivalent examination with 50% aggregate marks.
 Candidates have to be successful in SRSAT (SR Scholastic Assessment Test)/ JEE-Main/ State Level Engineering Entrance Exams across India including EAMCET/ Merit in Sports/ Cultural Activities.

Scholarship :
Scholarships will be given on basis of merit in Intermediate / 10+2 CBSE marks | JEE Mains percentile | EAMCET (TS & AP) or any other equivalent qualifying examination.

Eligibility Criteria for BBA/BBA-MBA
A Pass in 10+2 or equivalent examination with 50% and above in aggregate.

Eligibility Criteria for B.Sc. (Hons.) Agriculture
 A Pass in 10+2 or equivalent examination with 50% aggregate marks. Students with Physics, Chemistry, Mathematics/ Biology (PCB) are eligible.
 Two years Diploma in Agriculture / Seed Technology after 10th class or equivalent with a first-class.

Rankings

The National Institutional Ranking Framework (NIRF) ranked it 91 
among engineering colleges in 2022.

Technology Business Incubator
SR Group launched SRiX (SR Innovation Exchange), a Technology Business Incubator (TBI) in Warangal. This 1,00,000 square foot state-of-the-art TBI is supported by Department of Science & Technology (DST) and Government of India to accelerate the startup eco-system. The TIB (Technology Business Incubator) was started by Kalvakunta Taraka Rama Rao.

Development Centers
 Nest for Entrepreneurship in Science & Technology
 Center for AI & Deep Learning (CAIDL)
 The Industry-Institute Partnership Cell
 ENGINEERING PROJECTS IN COMMUNITY SERVICE (EPICS)
 INTERNAL QUALITY ASSURANCE CELL (IQAC)
 IBM Center of Excellence
 Microsoft I-Spark Center
 SR – CISCO Local Academy offers CCNA Certification course

SR University is a Private University located in Warangal, Telangana, India

References

Universities in Telangana
Private universities in India
2020 establishments in Telangana
Educational institutions established in 2020